A dude ranch is a guest ranch, a type of ranch oriented towards visitors or tourism. 

Dude ranch may also refer to:

Dude Ranch (Modern Family), a 2011 episode of the television series Modern Family
Dude Ranch (album), a 1997 album by Blink-182
Dude Ranch (film), a 1931 western film
Dude Ranchers Association, a trade association founded in 1926